The first season of the American Spanish-language reality television program La casa de los famosos premiered on August 24, 2021, with a live move-in on Telemundo. Telemundo renewed La casa de los famosos for a second season on November 16, 2021.

The season concluded on November 15, 2021, after 84 days of competition with Alicia Machado being crowned the winner, and Manelyk González the runner-up.

Format 

The series follows 16 celebrities living in a house together with no communication with the outside world as they compete for $200,000 prize. They are constantly filmed during their time in the house and are not permitted to communicate with those filming them. During their stay the Housemates share their thoughts on events of the house inside a private room referred to as the Confesionario (Confession Room). Each week, the housemates compete in the Head of Household competition. The winner is immune from eviction. Each housemate has three nomination points to give to two housemates, giving 2 points to one housemate and 1 point to the other. The housemates with the most nomination points are put up for eviction and the Head of Household must save one of the nominees. The public at home is able to vote on which participant to evict via the show's main website. The housemates are assigned tasks in order to win their weekly allowance for food.

Production

Development 
The series was announced at Telemundo's upfront for the 2021–22 television season. On July 28, 2021, it was announced that the series would be premiering on August 24, 2021.

Housemates 
16 housemates (Alicia, Anahí, Celia, Christian, Cristina, Daniel, Gabriela, Gisella, Jorge, Kelvin, Kimberly, Pablo, Roberto, Stephany, Uriel & Verónica) entered the game on Day 1. Manelyk González, influencer & reality TV star, was brought in on Day 30 to replace Kimberly Flores who walked out of the game on Day 18 due to personal reasons following a conversation with her husband inside the house.

Influencer Christian Estrada was originally announced to enter the series in the weeks prior to broadcast, as one of the housemates to move in during the show's launch, however, due to personal reasons, he withdrew from the show.

Nominations table
Every week, each participant is called to nominate two of their housemates, with the exception of that week's Head of Household. The first person a housemate nominates is for 2 points, whilst the second nomination is for just 1 point. The three participants with highest points, are nominated for elimination and it is up to the public's vote through Telemundo.com who gets evicted that week.

: Alicia, Christian, Kelvin, Pablo, and Roberto had their nominations voided due to conspiring about nominations to rig the results, which is against the rules.
: On Day 30, Manelyk entered the house as a new houseguest, replacing Kimberly. She was immune from nomination and eviction and was ineligible to nominate that week.
: During Week 8's head of household competition, the houseguests had to find the four chips that each contained a code to open the briefcase the chip corresponded to. Manelyk opened briefcase #1 that granted her the advantage to give nomination points of 2 and 2 instead of the usual points of 2 and 1. Verónica opened briefcase #2 that granted her the advantage to remove one nomination point against her. Kelvin opened briefcase #3 and won the HoH. Christian opened briefcase #4 that gave him the disadvantage of one automatic point against him in the nominations.
: Due to conspiring about nominating Manelyk, Christian's point against her was voided.
: Cristina, Kelvin, Manelyk, and Pablo conspired and announced their nominations to other houseguests. As a result, they had their nominations voided, and were automatically put up for eviction along with Alicia and Verónica, who had the most nominations. Gisella also conspired about her nominations and her points against Alicia were voided, however, due to being Head of Household she was not automatically put up for eviction and instead did not have the power to save one of the nominees.
: Alicia won a competition to become the first finalist and was immune from nomination and eviction.

Total received nominations

Episodes

References 

2021 American television seasons